Sunrise service is a worship service on Easter Sunday practiced by some Christian denominations, such as the Moravian Church.

The sunrise service takes place outdoors, sometimes in a park, and the attendees are seated on outdoor chairs or benches.

In the Roman Catholic, Eastern Orthodox, Lutheran, Methodist, Anglican, and Reformed churches, this ordinarily takes the form of the Easter Vigil, which can begin in the late evening of Holy Saturday or the early morning of Easter Sunday.

History
The first Easter Sunrise Service recorded took place in 1732 in the Moravian congregation at Herrnhut in the Upper Lusatian hills of Saxony.  After an all-night prayer vigil, the Single Brethren—the unmarried men  of the community—went to the town graveyard, God's Acre, on the hill above the town to sing hymns of praise to the Risen Saviour.  The following year, the whole Congregation joined in the service.  Thereafter the "Easter Morning" or "Sunrise Service" spread around the world with the Moravian missionaries.  The procession to the graveyard is accompanied by the antiphonal playing of chorales by brass choirs.

In the United States
Many churches in the American South still hold traditional sunrise services in cemeteries as a sign of recognition that Jesus no longer lay in the tomb on Easter morning. The service starts early in the morning and is timed so that the attendants can see the sun rise when the service is going. Services usually loosely follow the format of the church's normal service and can include music (hymns or praise band), dramatic scenes and the Easter message. After the service, the church may serve a breakfast for the attendees.

The most famous Moravian Sunrise Service in the United States is probably that of the Salem Congregation in what is now Winston-Salem, NC, held annually since 1772.  More than six thousand worshipers gather before dawn in front of the church to proclaim the Resurrection. The worshipers then move in procession to the historic graveyard, or "God's Acre".  Brass choirs from twelve congregations, totaling over five hundred members, play hymns antiphonally during the procession.  The service concludes with a proclamation of faith and hymns of hope.

In 2012, in Washington D.C., thousands of individuals gathered at the Lincoln Memorial for the ecumenical 34th “Sunrise Celebration” Easter service, a Washington tradition for Christians of all denominations. The tradition goes back for more than three decades.

Another long-running sunrise service dates back to 1944 atop Stone Mountain near Atlanta.  The park opens extremely early at 4am, and the skylift operates early as well to carry worshipers to the top and back down again.

Historic Jamestown Island is the site of an Easter Morning Sunrise Service in Virginia. Worshipers have gathered at the Foot of the Cross next to the James River annually since the 1950s.  Local Clergy and Volunteers lead the Ecumenical Program, with an average attendance of 500 - 750 people.

In the UK
Many Christian Churches join together to have a Sunrise service on Easter Day on a high piece of ground, or on the beach. Local churches around Dymchurch, Kent meet at 6.00 am to praise God for raising Jesus from the dead. They have the informal service on Dymchurch beach as they see the sun rise.

References

Protestant worship and liturgy
Easter liturgy